The 2013 St. Paul Cash Spiel was held from October 4 to 6 at the St. Paul Curling Club in St. Paul, Minnesota at the 2013–14 World Curling Tour. Both the men's and women's events were held in a round robin format. The purse for the men's event was CAD$16,000, while the purse for the women's event was CAD$7,200.

Men

Teams
The teams are listed as follows:

Round-robin standings
Final round-robin standings

Playoffs

Women
The teams are listed as follows:

Teams

Round-robin standings
Final round-robin standings

Playoffs

References

External links

2013 in curling
Curling in Minnesota